FC Buffalo is an American soccer club based in Buffalo, New York, United States, with teams in men's and women's soccer.

Founded in 2009, the men's team plays in the USL League Two, a national amateur league at the fourth tier of the American Soccer Pyramid, in the Midwest Division. In 2021, club owner Nicholas Mendola announced the launch of a women's soccer team, which started play in United Women's Soccer in May and went on to win consecutive division titles.

The team plays its home games at All-High Stadium, its home for 11 of 13 seasons. All-High famously played the role of Wrigley Field in the Robert Redford vehicle The Natural (film). The team's colors are blue, gold and white.

FC Buffalo participates in the Erie County Derby against Erie Commodores FC, a regional NPSL rivalry featuring two clubs in different states but counties of the same name. FC Buffalo also participates in the Western New York Derby against Rochester Lancers and the I-90 Derby against Syracuse FC.

History

Founding and inaugural season
FC Buffalo joined the NPSL as an expansion franchise in 2009 and took part in its first competitive season in 2010. While not a continuation of either franchise, FC Buffalo follows in the footsteps of two other recent Buffalo-based teams that competed in the NPSL: Queen City FC and Buffalo City FC. The team is owned by a group of five Buffalonians: Joshua Batten, Scott Frauenhofer, Donny Kutzbach, Nick Mendola and Ray Siminski.

The club had a contest for fans to submit a nickname and after much debate and thousands of votes cast, "Blitzers" was chosen. The vote was aided by Buffalo native and CNN broadcaster Wolf Blitzer airing an interview with owners Nick Mendola and Scott Frauenhofer discussing the contest.

ESPN correspondent Vincent Thomas commented: "Although the 'Blitzers' nickname has ended up being a pretty deft marketing move, it's more legit than a ploy. The term blitz comes from the German word for lightning, which is all over the team's logo and the city's municipal flag. And, of course, there's a mutual fondness between Blitzer and his hometown."

The Blitzers finished their opening campaign with six wins, two draws and four losses. They were the only team to defeat the Keystone Conference champion FC Sonic.

Subsequent seasons
On Dec 8, 2010, the Blitzers announced they had parted ways with head coach Jim Hesch. Ten days later, they announced via their web site that they had inked Daniel Krzyzanowicz to coach the club into the future. Krzyzanowicz helmed a Medaille College program that has made the NCAA tournament five times and reached the Sweet Sixteen in 2010.

The 2011 season was up-and-down, with the Blitzers winning five, drawing one and losing six. During the season the Blitzers took on the Bedlington Terriers F.C. in a friendly match at All High Stadium in the inaugural Bedlington Cup. Due to the connection of Robert E. Rich Jr. to Buffalo, NY and Bedlington, England. The friendly was arranged and the Terriers traveled to Buffalo for the match. The Blitzers won 5–1 in front of a sell out crowd. The match was filmed and later made into a BBC documentary called Mr Rich and The Terriers

The team's mascot Wolf Blitzer was unveiled at the Winter Wolves fund raiser. 2012 Season tickets were sold at the event. The unique feature of the 2012 season ticket is that it consists of a special season ticket holder's scarf that will function as admission to the season's home matches.

FC Buffalo saw its first player drafted into Major League Soccer on January 17, 2012 when midfielder Krystian Witkowski was claimed in the second round of the supplemental draft by the Philadelphia Union. The team then saw a player drafted into Major League Soccer for the second-consecutive year, as second-leading scorer Mike Reidy was selected 71st overall in the 2013 MLS Supplemental Draft by Sporting KC.

On November 20, 2012, FC Buffalo signed its third head coach, Brendan Murphy. The Buffalo native was a national champion as a player at St. Lawrence University. He led the team to a playoff spot in his first season, where they lost 5-2 to rivals Erie.

MLS called again in the 2017 MLS SuperDraft, when Liam Callahan went 24th overall to the Colorado Rapids and Russell Cicerone was selected by the Portland Timbers with the 76th pick. Weeks later, head coach Brendan Murphy was hired as goalkeeping coach by the Rochester Rhinos, and FC Buffalo hired University at Buffalo alum and Grand Island High School coach Frank Butcher as manager, tabbing former players John Grabowski and Casey Derkacz as assistants.

Butcher was the fastest coach to 10 wins in club history, and led the team to Germany for the 2019 preseason. The club played three matches including one against FC St. Pauli II, and also welcomed the Liga MX reserva side Monarcas Morelia and FC St. Pauli's first team for international friendlies.

The club elevated Butcher into an administrative position in 2021, hiring Ryan "Ozzy" Osborne as first team men's coach. Osborne won the Great Lakes Conference with Cleveland SC.

On May 9, 2022, the team announced that they would play their home games for the 2022 season at Dobson Field on the campus of D'Youville University while All-High Stadium is renovated.

Kit
The team take inspiration for their colors, royal blue and yellow gold, from the classic Buffalo Sabres uniforms. The badge features a crest with a soccer ball inside a circle of electric flashes under the team name and founding year. The logo is reminiscent of the municipal flag of Buffalo, NY. In 2015, the team returned to a Nike manufactured shirt and introduced three sets of uniforms. One all blue, one all yellow, and one all white. The kits can be mixed and matched on game day to create multiple unique and colorful looks.

The front jersey sponsor is Rich Products, a multinational food production corporation headquartered in Buffalo, New York. Rich's also owns and sponsors the local Triple-A International League baseball team, the Buffalo Bisons. Més Que, Buffalo's premier downtown soccer bar, and Batavia Downs Gaming & Casino are the two other shirt sponsors.

Kit manufacturers
2010–2011: Nike
2012–2014: Admiral
2015–2016: Nike
2016–2021: Adidas
2022–present: Corner Kits

Shirt sponsors
2010: Papa Jake's Saloon
2011–2016: Rich Products
2017: Lif Dental
2018: Soho Buffalo / Frankie Primo's +39
2019–2021: Hofbrauhaus Buffalo
2022–present: Community Beerworks

Players and staff

Current roster
As of 3 May 2022

Current Standings

Rust Belt Conference

2021 NISA Independent Cup — Great Lakes

Year-by-year

Tournaments

Managerial history

Honors
Erie County Derby Champions: 2015, 2016, 2017, 2019, 2020, 2021

International friendly
Lord Bedlington Cup
Winners (1): 2011

In inaugural competition, defeated Bedlington Terriers F.C. of England's Northern League, 5 –  1

Rivalries
 Supporters of FC Buffalo, Detroit City and AFC Cleveland formed the Rust Belt Derby modeled after the Cascadia Cup. The winner of the Derby is based on the head-to-head record of the Midwestern Conference clubs during regular season NPSL matches. Cleveland won the inaugural Rust Belt Derby on June 23, 2012 following a 1–1 draw with Detroit.
FC Buffalo claim as their top rival Erie and the sides compete in the EC (Erie County) Derby. To Date FC Buffalo have five wins, eight losses and three ties against Erie and is unbeaten in its last six.

Stadium
 Robert E. Rich All-High Stadium; Buffalo, New York (2010–2013, 2015–2021, 2022-present)
 Dobson Field; Buffalo, New York (2022)
 Canisius College; Buffalo, New York (2014)
 Hamburg High School; Hamburg, New York (2015 – 1 match)

Fans
 FC Buffalo's supporters group is known as "The Situation Room"; named after Wolf Blitzer's CNN news program. Their goal is to create an atmosphere that is the loudest and most inclusive of any fan base in the City of Buffalo.

Affiliated teams
 Bedlington Terriers F.C. 
 Buffalo Bisons 
 Jamestown Jammers

References

External links
 Official website
 FC Buffalo Twitter
 FC Buffalo 360 You Tube page
 The Situation Room Official Supporters Site
 Buffalo soccer team to be named after local hero

 
Association football clubs established in 2009
Sports in Buffalo, New York
2009 establishments in New York (state)
Men's soccer clubs in New York (state)